Palaeoctopus newboldi is an extinct basal octopod that lived in the Late Cretaceous, approximately 89 to 71 million years ago. Fossil material assigned to this species originates from the Mount Hajoula region in Lebanon. The holotype was found below the Old Covent, Sahel-el-Alma, Mount Lebanon and is deposited at the Natural History Museum in London. It might belong to the Cirrina or be more basal in the Octopoda.  Specimens from the Turonian of Vallecino, Mexico, originally described as P. pelagicus, are reinterpreted to be portions of a coelacanth.

See also
Jeletzkya douglassae
Proteroctopus ribeti
Vampyronassa rhodanica
2009 extinct fossil octopus discoveries

References

External links
The Octopus News Magazine Online: Fossil Octopuses

Octopuses
Cephalopod genera
Fossil taxa described in 1896